Melecio Arranz (May 23, 1888 – April 24, 1966) was a Filipino politician, born in Alcala, Cagayan.

Early life and career
He obtained his degree of Bachelor of Science in Civil Engineering from the University of Santo Tomas. His government service began in 1914 when he worked as Junior Assistant Engineer at the Bureau of Public Works and became District Engineer of Bataan and Rizal (1919) and later was promoted as Supervising District Engineer.

Political life
As Senator, he was elected in 1928 representing the First Senatorial District comprising Cagayan, Isabela, Ilocos Sur, Ilocos Norte and Abra. Reelected in 1934, 1941 and 1946, his term ended in 1951. He was the Majority leader of the Senate of the Philippines from 1945 to 1946. He was floor leader and Chairman of the Committee on Public Works and Communications (1936) and floor leader and Senate President Pro-Tempore (1946–1949).

In 1947, he was appointed Chief Delegate of the Philippines to the United Nations Commission on Korea.

Arranz coined the term "Solid North".

Personal life
He was married to Consuelo Arguelles. Melecio's grandson Conrado "Dado" Tinsay II is following in his footsteps.

Death
He died on April 24, 1966.

References

1888 births
1966 deaths
People from Cagayan
Presidents pro tempore of the Senate of the Philippines
Majority leaders of the Senate of the Philippines
Senators of the 2nd Congress of the Philippines
Senators of the 1st Congress of the Philippines
Senators of the 1st Congress of the Commonwealth of the Philippines
Senators of the 10th Philippine Legislature
Senators of the 9th Philippine Legislature
Senators of the 8th Philippine Legislature
Liberal Party (Philippines) politicians
University of Santo Tomas alumni
Nacionalista Party politicians
20th-century Filipino engineers
Members of the National Assembly (Second Philippine Republic)